Ellis Peniston Gardner (born September 16, 1961) is a former American football offensive lineman in the National Football League (NFL). He played for the Kansas City Chiefs and the Indianapolis Colts. He played collegiately for the Georgia Tech football team, where he also lettered in Wrestling and Track while achieving a 3.6 GPA in Electrical Engineering.

1961 births
Living people
People from Chattanooga, Tennessee
American football offensive tackles
Georgia Tech Yellow Jackets football players
Kansas City Chiefs players
Indianapolis Colts players